Giorgi Begadze (born 4 March 1986) is a Georgian rugby union player who plays as a scrum-half for RC Kochebi Bolnisi in the Georgia Championship and the Georgia national team.

References

1986 births
Living people
Rugby union players from Tbilisi
Expatriate rugby union players from Georgia (country)
Rugby union players from Georgia (country)
Georgia international rugby union players
The Black Lion players
Rugby union scrum-halves